Thomas W. Lippman is a journalist and author, specializing in the Middle East and Saudi Arabia–United States relations.

Life 
Lippman attended Regis High School in Manhattan and earned his Bachelor of Arts from Columbia as a French major in 1961. Lippman spent more than 30 years with The Washington Post as a writer, editor and diplomatic correspondent, also serving as the Middle East bureau chief for the Post. Lippman currently serves as an adjunct scholar at the Middle East Institute.

Books

References

External links

Living people
American male journalists
Journalists from New York City
The Washington Post people
Columbia College (New York) alumni
1939 births
Regis High School (New York City) alumni
20th-century American journalists